Colin Alan Daniel (born 15 February 1988) is an English footballer who plays for  club Scunthorpe United. Primarily a left-sided defender, he can also play as a winger, wing-back, or forward. 

He began his career with non-League Eastwood Town, before winning a move to Crewe Alexandra in July 2007. From Crewe he was loaned out to Grays Athletic, Leek Town, Halifax Town, and Macclesfield Town, before he joined Macclesfield Town on a permanent basis in May 2009. He spent three years with Macclesfield, before moving on to Mansfield Town for an undisclosed fee in August 2012. He helped Mansfield to win the Conference Premier title in 2012–13. He signed with Port Vale in June 2014, before returning to Mansfield on loan in February 2016. He joined Blackpool in June 2016, and helped the club to achieve promotion out of EFL League Two via the play-offs in 2017. He joined Peterborough United in May 2018, before switching to Burton Albion in January 2019. He stayed with Burton for 18 months and then signed with Exeter City in August 2021. He was loaned out to Aldershot Town in February 2022.

Daniel returned to non-League football with Scunthorpe United in July 2022.

Career

Crewe Alexandra
Crewe Alexandra manager Dario Gradi signed Daniel from Northern Premier League side Eastwood Town for a "five-figure sum" in July 2007. He made his debut for the "Railwaymen" on 15 December, coming on as an 89th-minute substitute for Nicky Maynard in a 3–0 defeat to Hartlepool United at Victoria Park. In January 2008 Daniel signed for Conference Premier club Grays Athletic on a one-month loan. He made his debut for the "Blues" coming on from the bench in the 1–1 FA Trophy Third Round match against York City at Bootham Crescent on 12 January. He made three appearances for Grays before returning to Crewe on 1 February. He joined Northern Premier League side Leek Town on loan in March 2008. He scored three goals in eight games for the club.

He joined newly formed club Halifax Town on loan in the Northern Premier League Division One North in October 2008. He scored a hat-trick for Halifax against Clitheroe. He returned to Crewe and scored his first goal in the English Football League on 24 January in a 5–1 defeat to Northampton Town at Sixfields Stadium.

Macclesfield Town
Daniel joined Keith Alexander's Macclesfield Town on loan on 24 March for the remainder of the 2008–09 season. He played eight League Two games, and after being released by Crewe in May 2009 he signed a one-year contract with Macclesfield.

He made 41 appearances in the 2009–10 campaign and signed a new two-year deal with the club in April 2010. He scored ten goals in 49 games in the 2010–11 season.

Daniel underwent hernia surgery in August 2011, after manager Gary Simpson admitted that "we feel best to sort out now rather than risk it getting much worse". Despite injury problems restricting him to just five appearances at the start of the 2011–12 season, he signed a new one-year contract extension in October to keep him at the club until summer 2013. On 7 January, he scored in a 2–2 draw with Premier League side Bolton Wanderers in the FA Cup at Moss Rose.

Mansfield Town
Daniel was signed by Conference Premier side Mansfield Town for an undisclosed fee in August 2012. He ended the 2012–13 campaign with five goals in 43 appearances as Paul Cox's "Stags" won promotion into the Football League as champions of the Conference.

He scored three goals in 32 matches in the 2013–14 season, the first of which was a "powerful free-kick" against Morecambe that won him a place on the EFL team of the week. The third of these goals was the only goal of the game against Bristol Rovers to relegate Rovers out of the Football League on 3 May. This goal ensured him of a warm welcome at Bristol City, despite him never playing for the club. Nottingham Post reporter Sarah Clapson described Daniel, who played at left wing-back in a 3–5–2 formation, as "a bit inconsistent" during the campaign despite showing good potential.

Port Vale
Daniel signed a two-year contract with League One club Port Vale in June 2014. Daniel said that "as soon as Micky Adams called me I couldn't say no because Port Vale are a big club." In October, new boss Rob Page told Daniel he was not a part of his first team plans and suggested he go out on loan, but Daniel remained at Vale Park and on 1 November he came off the bench to score the winning goal away at Colchester United. He remained in and around the first team, featuring 30 times throughout the 2014–15 season despite missing February with an ankle injury.

He started the 2015–16 campaign on the bench, but put himself in the frame for a place in the starting line up after coming off the bench to score at Fleetwood Town on 26 September. However, by February he was behind Byron Moore, Matty Kennedy and Sam Kelly in the pecking order, and manager Rob Page allowed him to leave the club on loan. On 23 February, he returned to former club Mansfield on loan until the end of the season after being signed by manager Adam Murray, who was a teammate during Daniel's previous spell at the club. He was released by Port Vale upon the expiry of his contract at the end of the season.

Blackpool
In June 2016, Daniel joined League Two side Blackpool on a one-year contract with the option of a further year. Manager Gary Bowyer stated: "He offers pace, energy and creativity out wide and will be a great asset to have in the team." He opened his account with the club on his ninth appearance, scoring two goals to help secure a 3–0 win over Yeovil Town at Huish Park on 13 September – this performance earned him a place on the EFL team of the week. He ended the 2016–17 season with four goals in 41 games, including an appearance in the play-off final at Wembley Stadium where the "Tangerines" defeated Exeter City 2–1 to win promotion into League One.

He scored four goals in 44 appearances across the course of the 2017–18 campaign as Blackpool consolidated their third tier status with a 12th-place finish. After Daniel provided a hat-trick of assists in a 5–0 victory over Bradford City on 7 April, Bowyer stated that he believed Daniel could go on to play in the EFL Championship. He was offered a new contract by Blackpool but instead opted to move on to a new club.

Peterborough United
On 24 May 2018, Daniel signed a two-year contract with League One side Peterborough United; manager Steve Evans said that "we have had to be patient as the kid has taken, quite rightly in my opinion, time to speak to a number of clubs that I would see competing at the top end of League One next season." He started the 2018–19 season in good form at left-back but was guilty of giving away too many penalties and slipped behind Tyler Denton and Daniel Lafferty in the pecking order. He featured 25 times for the "Posh" before he was dropped from the first-team and given permission to leave London Road on a free transfer following a 2–0 defeat at Barnsley on Boxing Day.

Burton Albion
On 21 January 2019, Daniel signed an 18-month contract with Burton Albion; manager Nigel Clough said the "Brewers" were in need of a left-sided player and "he's always done well when he's played against us". He featured 18 times in the second half of the 2018–19 season. He made 31 appearances in the 2019–20 campaign and signed a new one-year contract in the summer with a "substantial wage cut" due to the financially devastating effects of the COVID-19 pandemic in England. He scored the opening goal of the EFL Cup tie with Premier League Aston Villa at the Pirelli Stadium on 15 September 2020, though Villa came back to win the game. However he struggled with back problem and found his first-team opportunities limited after Jimmy Floyd Hasselbaink replaced Jake Buxton as manager in January. He ended the 2020–21 season with 23 appearances to his name after Hasselbaink made a number of defensive acquisitions during the January transfer window. On 12 May 2021, it was announced that he would be one of 12 players leaving Burton at the end of the season.

Exeter City
On 24 August 2021, Daniel joined League Two side Exeter City on a one-year deal. Manager Matt Taylor said that Daniel had impressed on trial "with character first and foremost". He was signed to provide cover for the injured Jack Sparkes, as only Callum Rowe and Jake Caprice could play on the left-hand side of the pitch at St James Park. He featured eight times for the "Grecians", scoring one goal in the EFL Trophy. On 26 February 2022, Daniel joined National League side Aldershot Town on loan for the remainder of the 2021–22 season. He played ten games for Mark Molesley's "Shots". Daniel was released by Exeter City after the club secured promotion at the end of the 2021–22 season.

Scunthorpe United
On 13 July 2022, Daniel joined newly-relegated National League club Scunthorpe United on a one-year contract having impressed manager Keith Hill during a one week trial.

Style of play
A left-sided player, he can play as a midfielder, winger, full-back, wing-back, or forward. In June 2014, Daniel stated that "I'm a quick player. I like to defend and retain the ball."

Career statistics

Honours
Mansfield Town
Conference Premier: 2012–13

Blackpool
EFL League Two play-offs: 2017

References

External links

1988 births
People from Eastwood, Nottinghamshire
Footballers from Nottinghamshire
Living people
English footballers
Association football midfielders
Eastwood Town F.C. players
Crewe Alexandra F.C. players
FC Halifax Town players
Grays Athletic F.C. players
Leek Town F.C. players
Macclesfield Town F.C. players
Mansfield Town F.C. players
Port Vale F.C. players
Blackpool F.C. players
Peterborough United F.C. players
Burton Albion F.C. players
Exeter City F.C. players
Aldershot Town F.C. players
Scunthorpe United F.C. players
Northern Premier League players
English Football League players
National League (English football) players